Fredericksburg is an independent city located in the Commonwealth of Virginia. As of the 2020 census, the population was 27,982. The Bureau of Economic Analysis of the United States Department of Commerce combines the city of Fredericksburg with neighboring Spotsylvania County for statistical purposes.

Located near where the Rappahannock River crosses the Atlantic Seaboard fall line, Fredericksburg was a prominent port in Virginia during the colonial era. During the Civil War, Fredericksburg, located halfway between the capitals of the opposing forces, was the site of the Battle of Fredericksburg and Second Battle of Fredericksburg. These battles are preserved, in part, as the Fredericksburg and Spotsylvania National Military Park. More than 10,000 African-Americans in the region left slavery for freedom in 1862 alone, getting behind Union lines. Tourism is a major part of the economy. Approximately 1.5 million people visit the Fredericksburg area annually, including the battlefield park, the downtown visitor center, events, museums, art shops, galleries, and many historical sites.

Fredericksburg is home to Central Park (as of 2004, the second-largest mall on the East Coast). The Spotsylvania Towne Centre is located in Spotsylvania County, adjacent to the city. Major employers include the University of Mary Washington (named for the mother of George Washington, who lived here), Mary Washington Healthcare, and GEICO. Many Fredericksburg-area residents commute to work by car, bus, and rail to Washington, D.C., and Richmond, as well as Fairfax, Prince William, and Arlington counties.

History
At the time of European encounter, the indigenous inhabitants of the area that became Fredericksburg were a Siouan-speaking tribe called the Manahoac. English colonists recorded the name of the Manahoac village there as Mahaskahod. Siouan tribes occupied much of the area of the Piedmont. The Tidewater areas of the coastal plain had primarily Algonquian-speaking tribes making up the Powhatan Confederacy.

Colonial
Located on the Rappahannock River near the head of navigation at the fall line, Fredericksburg developed as the frontier of colonial Virginia shifted west from the coastal plain into the Piedmont. The land on which the city was founded was part of a tract patented in 1671. The Virginia General Assembly established a fort on the Rappahannock in 1676, just downriver of the present-day city. In 1714, Lieutenant Governor Alexander Spotswood sponsored a German settlement called Germanna on the Rapidan River, a tributary of the Rappahannock upstream from the future site of the city. In 1716, he led an exploratory expedition westward over the Blue Ridge Mountains.

As interest in the frontier grew, the colonial assembly formed Spotsylvania County in 1720, named after Royal Lieutenant Governor Alexander Spotswood. In 1728, Fredericksburg was declared a port for the county, of which it was then a part. Named for Frederick, Prince of Wales, son of King George II, the colonial town named its streets after the members of the royal family. The county court was moved to Fredericksburg in 1732. Hence, the community served as county seat until 1780. The court was then moved to Spotsylvania Courthouse, Virginia – closer to the geographical center of Spotsylvania County. In 1781, Fredericksburg was incorporated as a town with its own court, council, and mayor. It received its charter as an independent city in 1879 and under Virginia law, was separated from Spotsylvania County. The city adopted its present city manager/council form of government in 1911.

The city has close associations with George Washington, whose family in 1738 moved to Ferry Farm in Stafford County near the Rappahannock River opposite Fredericksburg. Washington's mother, Mary, later moved to the city, and his sister Betty lived at Kenmore, a plantation house then outside the city. Several citizens played active roles during the American Revolution (1763–1781). For example, a number of locals signed the Leedstown Resolves, which formed an association to protest the Stamp Act in the 1760s. In the 1770s, Fielding Lewis, owner of Kenmore Plantation and brother-in-law to George Washington, also operated an arms factory for the Continental Army. Other significant early residents include the Revolutionary War generals Hugh Mercer and George Weedon, naval war hero John Paul Jones, and future U.S. president James Monroe. Thomas Jefferson wrote the Virginia Statute for Religious Freedom in Fredericksburg.

19th century

During the 19th century, mills continued to be developed along the Rappahannock River, which provided water power. There were mills for grinding flour, processing and weaving cotton, and other manufacturing. Fredericksburg sought to maintain its sphere of trade, but with limited success. It promoted the development of a canal on the Rappahannock and construction of a turnpike and plank road to bind the interior country to the market town. By 1837, a north–south railroad, which became the Richmond, Fredericksburg and Potomac Railroad, linked the town to Richmond, the state capital. A much-needed railroad joining the town to the West's arming region was not finished until after the Civil War.

During the Civil War, Fredericksburg was strategically important because of its port location midway between Washington and Richmond, the opposing capitals of the Union and the Confederacy. During the Battle of Fredericksburg from December 11–15, 1862, the town sustained significant damage from bombardment and looting by the Union forces.

During that engagement, nearly 10,000 enslaved people left area plantations and city households to gain freedom by crossing the Rappahannock River to Stafford County and join the Union lines, part of a movement by enslaved people throughout the South in wartime. John Washington, a literate enslaved person who shortly crossed to freedom, wrote later about people watching the approach of Union troops across the river from Fredericksburg: "No one could be seen on the street but the colored people. and every one of them seemed to be in the best of humors."

The Second Battle of Fredericksburg was fought in and around the town on May 3, 1863, in connection with the Chancellorsville campaign (April 27, 1863 – May 6, 1863). The battles of the Wilderness and Spotsylvania Court House were fought nearby in May 1864. The Washington Woolen Mill, a large three-story building, was converted to use as a hospital during the war.

After the war, Fredericksburg recovered its former position as a center of local trade and slowly grew beyond its prewar boundaries. Neither the city of Fredericksburg nor the surrounding counties reached the 1860 level of population again until well into the 20th century. After the war, many freedmen moved to Richmond and Petersburg, where there had been established free black communities before the war, and there was more work.

20th century to present
In the early 20th century, as the Jim Crow era continued in the South, there was widespread population movement. Many African-Americans left rural areas of the South for work and other opportunities in industrial cities of the North and Midwest in the Great Migration. Some settled in Washington, D.C., where there were more opportunities, or further north.

War-related buildup at defense facilities for World War II added to the area's population in the 1940s. The 1960s brought renewed growth and development, fueled by the construction of Interstate 95, which eased commuting and trade. By the 1970s, the city and the area had become a bedroom community for jobs in Northern Virginia and Washington, D.C. Headquarters agencies, lobbyists, consultants, defense and government contractors, and a range of other businesses were part of the regional economy influenced by the U.S. government. The city also benefited from its relative proximity to four military installations: the United States Marine Corps' Quantico Base, the U.S. Army's Fort Belvoir, the U.S. Navy's Dahlgren Surface Weapons Base, and the Virginia National Guard's Fort A.P. Hill.

The University of Mary Washington was founded in Fredericksburg in 1908 as the State Normal and Industrial School for Women, to train white women for teaching K-12 and industrial skills. Adopting the name of Mary Washington College in 1938, the college was for many years associated with the University of Virginia (then limited to white men) as a women's liberal arts college. The college officially desegregated in 1964. The college became independent of the University of Virginia and began to accept men in 1970. In 2004, the college changed its name from Mary Washington College to the University of Mary Washington. Two additional campuses for graduate and professional studies and education and research are located in Stafford County and in King George County, respectively.

Musician Link Wray of Fredericksburg developed the power chord of modern rock guitar in 1958 during his first improvisation of the instrumental piece "Rumble", a single released by Wray & His Ray Men. This innovation became widely used by rock guitarists. In the early 21st century, the local music scene includes a wide variety of genres.

A commuter rail line – the Virginia Railway Express – was established in the 1980s, providing passage to Washington, D.C. and other cities north of Fredericksburg.

The city has become the regional healthcare center for the area. Retail, real estate, and other commercial growth exploded in the early 21st century, eventually slowing during the Great Recession beginning in 2007. Hispanic growth skyrocketed from 2011 to 2020, with Chancellor Green in nearby Spotsylvania County becoming a local enclave.

Geography and climate

The city is part of the boundary between the Piedmont and Tidewater regions, and as such is located on the fall line, as evident on the Rappahannock River.

The city is bounded on the north and east by the Rappahannock River; across the river is Stafford County. The city is bounded on the south and west by Spotsylvania County.

Fredericksburg has a four-season humid subtropical climate (Köppen Cfa), with cool winters and hot, humid summers. Daytime temperatures for much of the year average slightly higher than in Washington, D.C. due to the southerly aspect, although the inland location and distance from the urban heat island present in the nation's capital make for significantly cooler low temperatures.

Demographics

2020 census

Note: the US Census treats Hispanic/Latino as an ethnic category. This table excludes Latinos from the racial categories and assigns them to a separate category. Hispanics/Latinos can be of any race.

As of the census of 2020, there were about 29,000 people, 8,102 households, and 3,925 families residing in the city. The racial makeup of the city was 54% White, 21% Black or African American, 0.31% Native American, 4.74 Asian, 0.067 Pacific Islander, 2.56% from other races, and 1.95% from two or more races.12% of the population were Hispanic or Latino of any race.

There were 8,102 households, out of which 21.6% had children under the age of 18 living with them, 31.8% were married couples living together, 13.1% had a female householder with no husband present, and 51.6% were non-families. 39.2% of all households were made up of individuals, and 12.8% had someone living alone who was 65 years of age or older. The average household size was 2.09 and the average family size was 2.81.

In the city, the population was spread out, with 17.8% under the age of 18, 23.8% from 18 to 24, 27.2% from 25 to 44, 18.4% from 45 to 64, and 12.8% who were 65 years of age or older. The median age was 30 years. For every 100 females, there were 81.8 males. For every 100 females age 18 and over, there were 78.4 males.

The median income for a household in the city was $34,585, and the median income for a family was $47,148. Males had a median income of $33,641 versus $25,037 for females. The per capita income for the city was $21,527. 15.5% of the population and 10.4% of families were below the poverty line. Out of the total population, 19.9% of those under the age of 18 and 8.8% of those 65 and older were living below the poverty line.

Crime
The Fredericksburg Police Department tracks crime information under the state-level system of the Uniform Crime Reporting program.   Per state code, the central repository for crime statistics rests with the Department of State Police, which compiles data from all of the participating agencies into an annual publication .

Politics
By long-standing tradition (dating back to the Federal Hatch Act of 1939, which prohibited government employees from participating in partisan politics), local elections in Fredericksburg are officially non-partisan. Neither the mayoral and council elections nor local constitutional positions (e.g. sheriff, Commissioner of Revenue, Commonwealth Attorney) list candidates with a party label.

Like the rest of Northern Virginia, Fredericksburg has trended strongly Democratic in the early 21st century. In the 2008 presidential election, voters in Fredericksburg gave Barack Obama a total of 63.6% of the vote. Only Arlington County, Alexandria, and Falls Church in Northern Virginia had a higher percentage of votes for Obama. No Republican presidential candidate has carried Fredericksburg since George H. W. Bush did so in 1988. In the 2016 presidential election, then-candidate Donald Trump garnered the lowest percentage of the city's vote for any Republican candidate since 1936; about two percent fewer votes were garnered in 2020.

Fredericksburg operates with a council-manager government, with Mary Katherine Greenlaw as the current mayor, first elected in 2012 and re-elected in 2016 and 2020.

The following is the current makeup of City Council.

Culture and recreation

Architecture and historic sites

Despite recent decades of suburban growth, reminders of the area's past abound. The 40-block Fredericksburg Historic District, listed on the National Register of Historic Places, embraces the city's downtown area and contains more than 350 buildings and locations dating to the 18th and 19th centuries, including the Fredericksburg Town Hall and Market Square, Lewis Store, and former site of the Slave Auction Block.

Within the historic district, four 18th-century historic sites have been managed by the "Washington Heritage Museums":  the Mary Washington House, where George Washington's mother lived in her final years; the late 18th-century Rising Sun Tavern, and the Hugh Mercer Apothecary Shop (the fourth, the St. James House (built 1768), is open to the public only during Historic Garden Week). Important public buildings include the 1852 courthouse designed by James Renwick, whose works include the Smithsonian Institution's castle building in Washington and St. Patrick's Cathedral in New York City, and the 1816 town hall and market house, now operated as the Fredericksburg Area Museum and Cultural Center. Another site of interest is St. George's Church.  The James Monroe Museum and Memorial Library is located on the site where Monroe practiced law from 1786 to 1788. The museum is housed in a building made up of three individual structures, constructed at different times, beginning in 1816.

Near the historic district is the Lewis Plantation, later named Kenmore, the plantation home of George Washington's sister Betty and her husband, Fielding Lewis.

Civil War battles are commemorated in Fredericksburg and Spotsylvania National Military Park. Formed by an act of Congress in 1927, the national military park preserves portions of the battlefields of Fredericksburg, Chancellorsville, the Wilderness, and Spotsylvania Court House. The Fredericksburg National Cemetery, also part of the park, was developed by the federal government after the war on Marye's Heights on the Fredericksburg battlefield. It contains more than 15,000 Union burials from the area's battlefields. Many unidentified soldiers were buried in mass graves.

Among the 10,000 slaves crossing the Rappahannock for freedom with the Union in 1862 was John Washington. A literate slave from Fredericksburg, he settled in New York and wrote an account of the wartime events several years later. His manuscript was discovered in the 1990s. It was published as the basis of two books, David W. Blight's A Slave No More (2007), and John Washington's Civil War: A Slave Narrative (2008), edited by Crandall Shifflett. In 2010, the National Park Service, which manages the battlefield, Stafford County, and the City of Fredericksburg worked collaboratively to post new historical markers on either side of the Rappahannock River as part of a "Freedom Trail" to mark this exodus.

Notable 20th-century sites and structures include the campus of the University of Mary Washington (begun in 1908), and Carl's Ice Cream, an Art Moderne roadside ice cream stand, listed on the National Register of Historic Places.

The historic community of Falmouth lies across the Rappahannock to the north and includes the historic house Belmont, home of American Impressionist artist Gari Melchers.

Parks
Public parks run by the city include:
 Old Mill Park
 Alum Spring Park
 Hurkamp Park
 Dixon Park

Public Library
Central Rappahannock Regional Library

Education

Primary and secondary schools
The Fredericksburg City Public Schools are run independently of the surrounding counties. The public primary and secondary schools include:
 James Monroe High School
 Walker-Grant Middle School
 Hugh Mercer Elementary School
 Lafayette Elementary School
Private schools include:
 Fredericksburg Academy
 Fredericksburg Christian School
 Saint Michael the Archangel High School
 Lighthouse Academy

Higher education
The University of Mary Washington, established in 1908 and opening in 1911, is a four-year public university within the city.

Germanna Community College, established in 1970, is a public two-year program with a campus in Fredericksburg.

Media
Fredericksburg's daily newspaper is The Free Lance–Star. The Free Lance was first published in 1885, and competed with two twice-weekly papers in the city during the late 19th century, the Fredericksburg News and The Virginia Star. While the News folded in 1884, the Star moved to daily publication in 1893. In 1900, the two companies merged, with both newspapers continuing publication until 1926, when they merged as a single daily newspaper under the current title. Until June 19, 2014, the Free Lance–Star was owned and operated by members of the Rowe family of Fredericksburg. At that time, Sandton Capital Partners purchased the paper. On December 31, 2015, the newspaper and associated website were purchased by Berkshire Hathaway′s BH Media Group. Fredericksburg.Today, an online hyperlocal news site began operation following the 2014 bankruptcy of The Free Lance–Star.

Fredericksburg and the nearby region have several radio stations, including (on the FM dial) WQIQ (88.3, "Radio IQ", public radio, licensed to nearby Spotsylvania), WLJV (89.5, contemporary Christian), WPER (90.5, Christian), WFLS (93.3, country), WGRQ (95.9, "SuperHits", classic hits, licensed to nearby Fairview Beach), WWUZ (96.9, classic rock, licensed to nearby Bowling Green), WVBX (99.3, contemporary hit radio, licensed to nearby Spotsylvania), WBQB ("B-101.5", adult contemporary) and WGRX ("Thunder 104.5", country, licensed to nearby Falmouth). Fredericksburg AM stations include WFVA (1230, news and talk) and WNTX (1350, talk, news, and sports). WGRQ and WGRX are owned locally by Telemedia Broadcasting. WFLS, WWUZ, WVBX, and WNTX are owned by Alpha Media.

In 2001, the Arbitron media service began listing the Fredericksburg area as a nationally rated radio market. As of the fall of 2014, the area ranked 146th out of 272 markets surveyed, with a total market population of more than 325,000. Large broadcast companies like Clear Channel Communications and Cumulus Broadcasting are not active in the local market; almost all of its stations remain locally or regionally owned.

In television, Fredericksburg is part of the Washington market. One local television station, NBC affiliate WHFV, was briefly on the air in the 1970s.

Sports
The Fredericksburg Nationals minor league baseball team began play at Virginia Credit Union Stadium in 2021.

Sports at the secondary education level are run through the Virginia High School League. On the collegiate level are the University of Mary Washington Eagles. Other amateur athletics include Fredericksburg FC of the National Premier Soccer League (NPSL); and the Rappahannock Rugby Football Club, a senior men's and women's rugby club competing in Division II (men) and Division III (women) of the Capital Rugby Union.

Transportation

Fredericksburg is traversed by a series of rural and suburban four-lane highways and a multitude of small, two-lane roads. The primary highway serving Fredericksburg is Interstate 95, which connects northward to Washington, D.C. and southward to Richmond, Virginia. Among the major arterial roads is U.S. Route 17, providing northwest–southeast transportation across the region. Through Fredericksburg, I-95 and US 17 are concurrent, though a local business route on the latter provides local access to downtown. Route 3 (Plank Road) is a major east–west route that connects downtown Fredericksburg (via the Blue and Gray Parkway bypass), southern Stafford and King George counties, and Route 301 to the east with the large shopping centers, Spotsylvania Town Center and Central Park. To the west, Route 3 reaches Culpeper, where it meets Route 29 and Route 15.

Most of Fredericksburg's traffic flow is to or from the north (Washington, D.C. metropolitan area) during peak commuting hours, primarily via I-95 and U.S. Route 1. The Route 1 bridge over the Rappahannock River is often a traffic bottleneck, and Route 3 has become increasingly congested as residential development grows and as the location of major regional shopping centers.

As an alternative to I-95, some commuters use the Virginia Railway Express rail service to Washington. Long-distance rail service to the north is available on Amtrak's Northeast Regional trains. Long-distance rail service to the south is provided by Amtrak's Silver Meteor, Carolinian, Palmetto and Piedmont trains

Fredericksburg Regional Transit (FRED) is a bus service that started in 1996 in Fredericksburg and serves most area communities, retail shopping centers, two VRE stations, and downtown Fredericksburg.

Four major airports serve Fredericksburg and the surrounding area.  Reagan National and Dulles International Airports are to the north within Virginia. Beyond them to the northeast is Baltimore/Washington International Airport in Maryland, and Richmond International Airport is south of Fredericksburg.

Notable people

19th century and earlier

20th century to present

Sister cities

Footnotes

References

External links

 

 
1728 establishments in Virginia
Cities in Virginia
Former county seats in Virginia
Historic districts on the National Register of Historic Places in Virginia
National Register of Historic Places in Fredericksburg, Virginia
Populated places established in 1728
Washington metropolitan area